The Verkhovna Rada of Ukraine of the 9th convocation is the current convocation of the legislative branch of the Verkhovna Rada, Ukraine's unicameral parliament. The 9th convocation meets at the Verkhovna Rada building in Kyiv, having begun its term on 29 August 2019 following the last session of the 8th Verkhovna Rada.

The 9th Verkhovna Rada's composition is based upon the results of the 21 July 2019 parliamentary election, which took place three months after the second round of the 2019 Ukrainian presidential election. Ukraine's head of state during the parliament's term is President Volodymyr Zelensky. Eleven parties were represented in the Verkhovna Rada, although only five of them surpassed the mandatory five percent election threshold to gain representation based on the proportional representation system.

About 80 percent of the members of parliament of this convocation were new to parliament; 83 deputies managed to get re-elected from the previous parliament and 13 deputies from earlier convocations. All deputies from the biggest party with 254 seats, Servant of the People, were political newcomers. 61 percent of the new MPs had never before been engaged in politics.

A total of 27 constituencies were not elected due to various crises taking place in the country. A total of 10 constituencies in the Autonomous Republic of Crimea and two in the City of Sevastopol were not elected due to the 2014 Crimean crisis and subsequent annexation of Crimea by Russia, while a further nine constituencies in Donetsk Oblast and six constituencies in Luhansk Oblast were not elected due to the ongoing War in Donbas. Elections in these regions can only take place after Ukraine re-establishes control over these territories.

Due to the 2022 full-scale Russian invasion of Ukraine, the activity of the largest opposition party, Opposition Platform — For Life, was suspended due to its alleged pro-Russian stance, for the duration of martial law.

Major legislation
 29 August 2019: Oleksiy Honcharuk is confirmed as prime minister with 290 votes in favor.
3 September 2019: Immunity from prosecution for lawmakers is canceled; 373 votes in favor.
4 February 2020: Bill to reduce the number of deputies from 450 to 300 is approved prior to a final vote to amend the constitution correspondingly; 236 votes in favor.
4 March 2020: Denis Shmyhal is confirmed as prime minister with 291 votes in favor.
31 March 2020: Bill on the land market, which makes it possible for citizens and legal entities to purchase agricultural land, is passed with 259 votes in favor.
23 September 2021: Bill on "de-oligarchization" passed with 279 votes in favor.
19 July 2021: MPs vote to approve the law on "national resistance" with 313 votes in favor.
7 October 2021: MPs vote to dismiss Dmytro Razumkov from his position as chairman with 284 votes in favor. Razumkov was replaced by his first deputy Ruslan Stefanchuk (also from Servant of the People) a day later.

Leadership

Leadership (August 2019 – )
On 29 August 2019, the parliament elected Dmytro Razumkov from Servant of the People as the Chairman of the Verkhovna Rada. On the same day, Razumkov officially announced all the names of parliamentary factions and deputy groups in parliament of the 9th convocation.

On 7 October 2021, Razumkov was removed from his position after a vote in which 284 MPs voted in favor of his dismissal. The dismissal was initiated by the ruling party Servant of the People after President Volodymyr Zelenskyy expressed disappointment in Razumkov for not supporting the party's initiatives and declaring that "he is not a member of our team anymore". Razumkov was replaced by his first deputy Ruslan Stefanchuk (also from Servant of the People) a day later.

Members

Parliamentary factions and groups
Government party (241)
  Servant of the People (241)
Government support (41)
  For the Future (parliamentary group) (21)
  Trust (parliamentary group) (20)
Opposition (111)
  Opposition Platform — For Life (39)
 
  Batkivshchyna (25)
  Holos (including the Justice parliamentary group) (20)
Others (25)
  Independents (25)
Vacant seats (27) 
  Vacant (27)

Committees
The Verkhovna Rada approved the composition of its 23 committees on 29 August 2019. This was done without a parliamentary debate, and to the dismay of some people's deputies who chanted: "shame!" and "what are you doing?". 19 of the 23 committees are headed by representatives of Servant of the People.

The committees and their management are as follows:

Committee on Matters of Agriculture and Land Policy
Chairperson Mykola Solskyi (Servant of the People)
First Deputy Oleh Meidych (Batkivshchyna)
Secretary Ivan Chaikivskyi (For the Future)
Committee on Matters of Anti-corruption Policy
Chairperson= Anastasiya Radina (Servant of the People)
First Deputy  (Holos)
Secretary Volodymyr Kabachenko (Batkivshchyna)
Committee on Matters of the Budget
Chairperson Yuriy Aristov (Servant of the People)
First Deputy Ivan Krulko (Batkivshchyna)
Secretary Volodymyr Tsabal (Holos)
Committee on Matters of Economic Development
Chairperson Dmytro Natalukha (Servant of the People)
First Deputy Serhiy Taruta (Batkivshchyna)
Secretary Yaroslav Rushchyshyn (Holos)
Committee on Matters of Digital Transformation
Chairperson Mykhailo Kriachko (Servant of the People)
First Deputy Kira Rudyk (Holos)
Secretary Serhiy Larin (Opposition Platform — For Life)
Committee on Matters of Education, Science and Innovation
Chairperson Serhiy Babak (Servant of the People)
First Deputy Oleksandr Lukashev (Opposition Platform — For Life)
Secretary Natalya Pipa (Holos)
Committee on Matters of Energy and Utilities
Chairperson Andriy Herus (Servant of the People)
First Deputy Oleksiy Kucherenko (Batkivshchyna)
Secretary Yurii Shapovalov (For the Future)
Committee on Matters of Environmental Policy and the Use of Natural Resources
Chairperson Oleh Bondarenko (Servant of the People)
First Deputy Stepan Ivakhiv (For the Future)
Secretary Oleksandr Feldman (Opposition Platform — For Life)
Committee on Matters of Foreign Policy and Inter-parliamentary Cooperation
Chairperson Oleksandr Merezhko (Servant of the People)
First Deputy Hryhoriy Nemyria (Batkivshchyna)
Secretary Solomiia Bobrovska (Holos)
Committee on Matters of Freedom of Speech
Chairperson Nestor Shufrych (Opposition Platform — For Life)
Deputy Yevheniy Brahar (Servant of the People)
Secretary Serhiy Shvets (Servant of the People)
Committee on Matters of Human Rights, Deoccupation and Integration of the Temporarily Occupied Territories of the Donetsk and Luhansk Oblasts as well as the Autonomous Republic of Crimea and Sevastopol, National Minorities, Inter-ethnic Relations
Chairperson Dmytro Lubinets (For the Future)
First Deputy Maksym Tkachenko (Servant of the People)
Secretary Rustem Umerov (Holos)
Committee on Matters of Humanitarian and Information Policy
Chairperson Mykyta Poturaiev (Servant of the People)
First Deputy Iryna Konstankevych (For the Future)
Secretary Oleksandr Abdullin (Batkivshchyna)
Committee on Matters of Integration of Ukraine with the European Union
Chairperson Ivanna Klympush-Tsintsadze (European Solidarity)
First Deputy Vadym Halaichuk (Servant of the People)
Secretary Valentyn Nalyvaichenko (Batkivshchyna)
Committee on Matters of Law Enforcement
Chairperson Denys Monastyrsky (Servant of the People)
First Deputy Andriy Osadchuk (Holos)
Secretary Serhii Minko (For the Future)
Committee on Matters of Legal Policy
Chairperson Andriy Kostin (Servant of the People)
First Deputy Vasyl Nimchenko (Opposition Platform — For Life)
Secretary Oleh Makarov (Holos)
Committee on Matters of National Security, Defense, and Intelligence
Chairperson Oleksandr Zavitnevych (Servant of the People)
First Deputy Mykhailo Zabrodskyi (European Solidarity)
Secretary Roman Kostenko (Holos)
Committee on Matters of the Nation's Health, Healthcare and Medical Insurance
Chairperson Mykhailo Radutskyi (Servant of the People)
First Deputy Valeriy Dubil (Batkivshchyna)
Secretary Yana Zinkevych (European Solidarity)
Committee on Matters of Organization of State Power, Local Self-government, and Regional and Urban Development
Chairperson Andriy Klochko (Servant of the People)
First Deputy Roman Lozynskyi (Holos)
Secretary Dmytro Isaienko (Opposition Platform — For Life)
Committee on Matters of Parliamentary Regulations, Deputy Ethics, and the Operation of the Verkhovna Rada
Chairperson Serhiy Kalchenko (Servant of the People)
First Deputy Serhiy Yevtushok (Batkivshchyna)
Secretary Mykhailo Papiev (Opposition Platform — For Life)
Committee on Matters of Social Policy and Protection of Veterans' Rights
Chairperson Halyna Tretiakova (Servant of the People)
First Deputy Mykhailo Tsymbaliuk (Batkivshchyna)
Secretary Mykola Babenko (Dovira)
Committee on Matters of Transport and Infrastructure
Chairperson Yuriy Kisiel (Servant of the People)
First Deputy Yulia Klymenko (Holos)
Secretary Hennadii Vatsak (Dovira)
Committee on Matters of Youth and Sport
Chairperson Andriy Kozhemyakin (Batkivshchyna)
First Deputy Zhan Beleniuk (Servant of the People)
Secretary Hryhoriy Surkis (Opposition Platform — For Life)
Committee on Matters of Finances, and Tax and Customs Policy
Chairperson Danylo Hetmantsev (Servant of the People)
First Deputy Yaroslav Zheleznyak (Holos)
Secretary Ihor Palytsia (For the Future)

References

External links

 
Ukrainian parliaments
2019 in Ukraine
Verkhovna Rada of Ukraine